The Chinese float-on/float-off ship Donghai Island is the first unit of a class of very little known naval auxiliary ship currently in service with the People's Liberation Army Navy (PLAN). The exact type remains unknown, and only a single unit of this class have been confirmed in active service as of 2020s, with pennant number 868. The float-on/float-off capability of the Donghai class is achieved via its semi-submersible hull design. This ship has received NATO reporting name Modified Hansa Sonderberg class, because it is derived from the Hans Sonderberg-class anchor handling tug supply vessel designed specifically for heavy-lifting and transporting large and heavy equipment such as oil rigs, and Donghai Island performs similar functions.

References

Auxiliary ships of the People's Liberation Army Navy